The qualification process for the 2014 Women's Rugby World Cup began on 5 February 2012. A total of 12 teams will qualify for the tournament, which will be held in France between 1 and 17 August 2014.

Qualification process
Following WRWC 2010, six teams received an automatic qualification berth - these berths being given the top 3 teams (New Zealand, England, and Australia), the hosts (France), Canada, and the United States. The remaining six berths for the tournament will be awarded through regional tournaments.

The non-automatic qualification process began on 5 February 2012. Twenty teams competed in over 49 matches to win one of the six remaining places at the 2014 tournament.

Regional qualification
There will be 12 nations participating in the 2014 Women's Rugby World Cup. Six teams have automatically qualified by virtue of their performance at the prior Rugby World Cup, leaving six teams to qualify through regional matches. Regional Qualification began on 5 February 2012, during the first round of the 2012 Women's Six Nations Championship.

In all, 26 national teams have been involved in the 2014 World Cup - six as automatic qualifiers and 20 as entrants in the qualification rounds.

* Samoa, despite being from Oceania, qualified through the European tournament.

African Qualification

Round One

The initial round of African qualification was the annual, two game, Elgon Cup tournament between Kenya and Uganda. Each team won their home games, however Uganda won on point aggregate.

One game each.  win the Elgon Cup 30–26 on aggregate

Round Two

South Africa played a single game against the Round One winners, Uganda. South Africa won easily, and secured qualification to the World Cup.

Americas Qualification

Canada and the United States automatically qualified.

Asian Qualification

The winner of the 2013 ARFU Asian Four Nations, Kazakhstan, qualified directly.

Round One

Singapore won the 2012 ARFU D2. They were promoted to D1 and were eligible to qualify

Round Two

Kazakhstan defeated tough competition to win the 2013 ARFU A4N and qualify directly.

European Qualification

France automatically qualified by virtue of being hosts. England automatically qualified by finishing second in the 2010 tournament. In addition, there were four other places available for European countries.

(Samoa participated in the European qualification)

Round One

The top two teams from the combined 2012 and 2013 Women's Six Nations Championship, Ireland and Wales, qualify directly. The remaining two teams, Italy and Scotland, proceed to Round Three.

Round Two

The top two teams from the 2012 Women's European Championship (Group B) proceed to Round Three.

Round Three

The four teams from the previous two rounds, plus Spain and Samoa, competed in a tournament. The top two teams, Spain and Samoa, qualified.

Oceanic Qualification

New Zealand and Australia automatically qualified by finishing first and third respectively in the 2010 tournament. Samoa qualified through the European qualification.

Sources

External links

. RWCWomens.com

2014 Women's Rugby World Cup
2012 in women's rugby union
2013 in women's rugby union